The Final Judgment is a 1915 American silent drama film produced by B. A. Rolfe and distributed by Metro Pictures. Actor Edwin Carewe directed. It stars Ethel Barrymore in her second silent film and first as a player for then new Metro Pictures, later to become a part of Metro-Goldwyn-Mayer in 1924.

A complete print of this film was preserved by Metro-Goldwyn-Mayer.

Cast
Ethel Barrymore as Jane Carleson, Mrs. Murray Campbell
Beatrice Maude as Hortense Carleson
Mahlon Hamilton as Murray Campbell
H. Cooper Cliffe as Hamilton Ross
Percy Standing as Henry Strong (credited as Percy G. Standing)
Paul Lawrence as Doctor Perry
M. W. Rale as Kato, valet to Ross

References

External links

1915 films
Silent American drama films
American silent feature films
Films based on short fiction
Films directed by Edwin Carewe
1915 drama films
American black-and-white films
Metro Pictures films
1910s American films